The International Residual Mechanism for Criminal Tribunals, also referred to as the IRMCT or the Mechanism, is an international court established by the United Nations Security Council in 2010 to perform the remaining functions of the International Criminal Tribunal for the former Yugoslavia (ICTY) and the International Criminal Tribunal for Rwanda (ICTR) following the completion of those tribunals' respective mandates.

Background 
In the early 1990s, the United Nations Security Council established two criminal courts whose purpose was to investigate and prosecute individuals responsible for war crimes, crimes against humanity, and genocide. The first of these courts was the International Criminal Tribunal for the former Yugoslavia (ICTY), which was established in 1993 to investigate crimes committed during the Yugoslav Wars. The second court, the International Criminal Tribunal for Rwanda (ICTR), was established the following year to address crimes committed during the Rwandan genocide. Both the ICTY and the ICTR were meant to be temporary institutions that would conclude after their mandate to investigate crimes and prosecute individuals was completed. Although both tribunals have completed substantially all of their mandates, there are residual functions that will not be accomplished for many more years. For example, future trials may be held once remaining ICTR fugitives are captured, convicted persons may still petition for early release, protective orders for witnesses may need to be modified, and the archives that contain confidential documents need to be safeguarded. In order to oversee the residual functions of the ICTY and ICTR in an efficient manner, the Security Council passed Resolution 1966 on 22 December 2010, which created the Mechanism.

Mandate 
In Resolution 1966, the Security Council decided that "the Mechanism shall continue the jurisdiction, rights and obligations and essential functions of the ICTY and the ICTR." The Security Council further envisioned that the Mechanism would be "a small, temporary and efficient structure, whose functions and size will diminish over time, with a small number of staff commensurate with its reduced functions." The Mechanism will continue to operate until the Security Council decides otherwise, however it will be subject to a two-year review beginning in 2016.

The Mechanism comprises two branches. One branch covers functions inherited from the ICTR and is located in Arusha, Tanzania. It commenced functioning on 1 July 2012. The other branch is located in The Hague, Netherlands and began operating on 1 July 2013. During the initial period of the Mechanism's work, there was a temporal overlap with the ICTR and the ICTY as these institutions complete outstanding work on any trial or appeal proceedings which are pending as of the commencement dates of the respective branches of the Mechanism.

Fugitives 
The tracking, arrest and prosecution of the four remaining fugitives still wanted for trial by the ICTR is a top priority for the Mechanism for International Criminal Tribunals. As of May 2022, four accused indicted by the ICTR for their participation in the genocide in Rwanda in 1994 remain at large.

Under Article 6(3) of its Statute, the Mechanism shall only retain jurisdiction over those individuals considered to be the most responsible for committing the gravest crimes. In accordance with this Article, the ICTR Prosecutor requested referrals to Rwanda in the cases of four fugitives: Fulgence Kayishema, Charles Sikubwabo, Aloys Ndimbati, Charles Ryandikayo.

With the arrest and transfer in 2011 of the last two fugitives for the ICTY, Ratko Mladić and Goran Hadžić, what was originally envisaged as a function of the Mechanism – trial of the ICTY’s remaining fugitives - was completed by the ICTY.

Principals 

The Principals of the Mechanism are the three persons who head the three separate organs of the Mechanism. All principals are appointed to renewable four-year terms.

President 

The President is head and the most senior judge of the Chambers, the judicial division of the Mechanism. The President is appointed by the Secretary-General following consultations with the President of the Security Council and the judges of the Mechanism.

Prosecutor 
The Prosecutor leads the investigation and prosecution of cases before the Mechanism and is nominated by the Secretary-General and appointed by the Security Council.

Registrar 

The Registrar, appointed by the Secretary-General, leads the Registry, which provides administrative, legal, policy and diplomatic support to Mechanism operations.

Judges 

The judges of the Mechanism are elected by the General Assembly from a roster prepared by the Security Council following nominations from member states of the United Nations. Judges serve for a term of four years and can be reappointed by the Secretary-General with the consultation of the Presidents of the Security Council and of the General Assembly. The Judges are present at the Mechanism only when necessary and at the request of the President. As much as possible, the Judges carry out their functions remotely.

References

External links
United Nations International Residual Mechanism for Criminal Tribunals

International courts and tribunals
Organisations based in The Hague
Organizations established in 2010
United Nations Security Council mandates